EGML may stand for:
Damyns Hall Aerodrome (ICAO code), an operational general aviation aerodrome in East London, England
Extended Game Maker Language, the programming language used in G-java